The men's 200 metres event at the 2021 European Athletics U23 Championships was held in Tallinn, Estonia, at Kadriorg Stadium on 9 and 10 July.

Records
Prior to the competition, the records were as follows:

Results

Round 1
Qualification rule: First 3 in each heat (Q) and the next 4 fastest (q) advance to the semifinal.

Semifinal
Qualification rule: First 3 in each heat (Q) and the next 2 fastest (q) advance to the semifinal.

Final

Wind: +0.3 m/s

References

200 metres
200 metres at the European Athletics U23 Championships